Henry Borwin II, Lord of Mecklenburg (1170 – 5 June 1226) was a member of the House of Mecklenburg, was a Prince of Mecklenburg from 1219 to 1226 and Lord of Rostock (1225-1226).

Life 
Henry Borwin II was a son of Henry Borwin I, Lord of Mecklenburg and Matilda of Blieskastel. He was the grandson of the Slavic prince Pribislav, the founder of the House of Mecklenburg.  After he died in 1226 in Güstrow, his four sons ruled Mecklenburg jointly until 1234.  They then divided Mecklenburg into the principalities of Werle, Parchim-Richenberg, Rostock and Mecklenburg.

Marriage and issue 
Henry Borwin married in 1200 Christina of Sweden (died: after 20 May 1248), the daughter of King Sverker II of Sweden.  They had the following children:
 Nicholas I, Lord of Werle (1210-1277)
 John I the Theologian, Lord of Mecklenburg (1211-1264)
 Henry Borwin III, Lord of Rostock (1220-1278)
 Pribislaw I, Lord of Parchim-Richenberg (1224-1256), died in 1275
 Margaret, (died after 18 August 1267), married in 1230 Count Gunzelin III of Schwerin
 Matilda, (died after 23 November 1270) married 1229 Duke Sambor II of Pomerelia

References

External links 
 Genealogical table of the House of Mecklenburg

Lords of Mecklenburg
Lords of Rostock
1170 births
1226 deaths
12th-century German nobility
13th-century German nobility